Machatothrips is a genus of thrips in the family Phlaeothripidae.

Species
 Machatothrips antennatus
 Machatothrips artocarpi
 Machatothrips biuncinatus
 Machatothrips braueri
 Machatothrips celosia
 Machatothrips corticosus
 Machatothrips decorus
 Machatothrips diabolus
 Machatothrips haplodon
 Machatothrips heveae
 Machatothrips indicus
 Machatothrips lentus
 Machatothrips quadrudentatus
 Machatothrips silvaticus

References

Phlaeothripidae
Thrips
Thrips genera